The slender-billed starling (Onychognathus tenuirostris) is a species of starling in the family Sturnidae. It is found in Burundi, Democratic Republic of the Congo, Eritrea, Ethiopia, Kenya, Malawi, Rwanda, Tanzania, Uganda, and Zambia.

References

slender-billed starling
Birds of East Africa
slender-billed starling
Taxonomy articles created by Polbot